"Pure Shores" is a song by English-Canadian girl group All Saints, released by London Records on 14 February 2000 as the lead single from The Beach: Motion Picture Soundtrack and the group's second studio album, Saints & Sinners (2000). Written by group member Shaznay Lewis and producer William Orbit, it is a dream pop song with ambient and electronica production.  The track has a syncopation of synth delays, arpeggiated and reverberated guitar, and various ethereal sound effects. It was composed for  a scene in the 2000 film, The Beach, where co-stars Leonardo DiCaprio and Virginie Ledoyen swim underwater. 

"Pure Shores" received acclaim from music critics, who praised the production, lyrics and vocals and has featured on several best-song lists. The song was also a commercial success worldwide, entering the UK Singles Chart at number one, where it remained for two weeks. It achieved worldwide success, topping the charts in Belgium (Wallonia), Ireland, Italy and Romania and also reaching the top ten in countries including Australia, Finland, France, Iceland, Japan, New Zealand, Norway and Sweden. It became the second most successful single of 2000 in the United Kingdom, selling a total of 815,000 copies there and received multiple certifications in other countries.

The music video for "Pure Shores" was directed by Vaughan Arnell and shows the group walking and singing at Wells-Next-The-Sea beach in Norfolk, England. The group performed the song on Top of the Pops, 2000 MTV Europe Music Awards, and the World Sports Awards in 2000. The single received accolades and nominations, and was awarded the Ivor Novello Award for Most Performed Work and was nominated for two BRIT Awards for Best British Single and Best British Video.

Writing and production
"Pure Shores" was written by All Saints group member Shaznay Lewis, and William Orbit, who also produced the song. Pete Tong, All Saints' A&R at the time, wanted the group to be a part of the soundtrack he was producing for Danny Boyle's 2000 adventure drama film, The Beach. Boyle, however, hated the idea of having a pop group associated with his film. Tong then contacted Orbit and convinced Boyle to include All Saints on the basis that Orbit would produce the song. Lewis wrote "Pure Shores" based on Orbit's backing track, and a 40-second clip from the scene where co-stars Leonardo DiCaprio and Virginie Ledoyen swim underwater. She had previously read half of the 1996 novel which the film was based on. Regarding the writing process, Lewis said: "It was a case of 'watch this, be inspired, go off and give it a go'. They didn't really point me in any direction of how they wanted it to be lyrically. Being given a brief like that, they'd already painted the picture for me."

Lewis originally wrote down the lyrics during an aeroplane flight to Los Angeles where she was going to work with Orbit on the song. However, after arriving at her hotel, she discovered that she lost the lyrics and had to rewrite them. The rewritten version had lyrics that were the same as the original, but also parts that were different. Lewis came up with the title "Pure Shores" after writing the song. "I've never even thought that it isn't mentioned once in the actual song," she said.

"Pure Shores" was recorded at Guerilla Beach and Conway Recording Studios in Los Angeles, and Whitfield Street and AIR Studios in London. Orbit and engineer Jake Davies used a Solid State Logic (SSL) 9000 J-series mixing console, Boxer 5 studio monitor, Sony 3348 digital multitrack recorder and the digital audio workstation Pro Tools. English mixing engineer Spike Stent mixed the song in his room at Olympic Studios in London using a SSL 4064 G-series console, Genelec monitor and Studer tape recorder. The song took Orbit such a long time to produce that he inevitably thought it was "pure shite", but in a 2021 interview claimed that it was "all right" and that "when you really slave over something, it takes years until you can really listen to it with pleasure."

Composition
Eschewing the R&B style of All Saints' previous releases, "Pure Shores" is a dream pop song, with electronica and ambient production. Tom Ewing from the e-zine Freaky Trigger described it as "a pop take on ambient music" with "chillout bubbles and ripples". Composed in  time and the key of D major, the song has a tempo of 102 beats per minute and a chord progression of D–Em–C–G, with a sequence of A–A9sus4–A9 in the bridge. Although written by Lewis, the lead vocals on the track are by group member Melanie Blatt; Lewis sings the bridge, and sisters Natalie and Nicole Appleton sing backing vocals and chorus harmonies. The song is built around a syncopation of synth delays, arpeggiated and reverberated guitar, and electronic percussion. Ethereal sound effects are filtered and distorted throughout, with some resembling whale vocalisations. All Saints harmonise, overlap, and meander around each other's vocal lines. The track has a relaxed pace with surges in the chorus and bridge. Richard Folland of PopMatters writes that "Pure Shores" is "buoyed by a lyric promising a bright future."

Critical reception
Critical response to "Pure Shores" was mostly positive upon release. Ed Potten of The Times found it "lushly produced" and appreciated the group's harmonies, characterising the song as the "musical equivalent of a pina colada: faintly exotic, syrupy sweet and ultimately quite intoxicating." Uncuts Chris Roberts wrote that it "will sound as floatily motivating in a decade's time", and said Orbit was responsible for the "brilliant" song's 
"beauty". Writing for Mixmag, Dorian Lynskey felt Orbit provided "a twist" to All Saints, describing the track as "a heady, sensual melancholy better suited to headphones than the Met Bar." In The Guardian, Caroline Sullivan argued that All Saints "lend radiance to [Orbit's] twinkling fairy lights" and their vocals "would be haunting even without Orbit's sparse production". John Walshe of Hot Press commented that the song combined Orbit's "swirling galaxies of sound with their harmony-driven pop to perfect effect".

Dan Gennoe of Q named it the "crowning glory" of The Beach soundtrack which "confirmed All Saints' position as pop's coolest girl band." Tom Horan of The Daily Telegraph deemed the track "fiendishly catchy". In The Sydney Morning Herald, Stephanie Peatling said the "lush" song "puts the streetwise cousins of the Spice Girls back on the block." Fiona Shepherd of The Scotsman described it as a "classy single" to "offset all the gossip column inches". Playlouders reviewer said the "bewitching" track found the group "ditching the famous-for-being-famous tag, and finally becoming the statuesque pop goddesses they always claimed to be."

James Poletti of Dotmusic, on the other hand, gave the song a rating of three out five, writing, "Despite Orbit's slightly lightweight electronics, the song isn't half bad". Jim Wirth of NME was less impressed, dismissing the track as "an inane enough confection of bleeps and fieldmouse rhythms which sounds so close to Madonna that it's almost indistinguishable." In a retrospective review,  Stylus Magazine critic Dom Passantino gave the song a rating of eight out of ten and called it "the last time any member of All Saints, William Orbit, and Leonardo DiCaprio were worth a collective damn".

Accolades and recognition
The song placed 18th on the NME Single of the Year list, while Playlouder ranked it as the best single of 2000. "Pure Shores" appeared on the year-end lists of various other publications including Les Inrockuptibles (number six), Muzik (number 11), The Face (number 18), and Melody Maker (number 28). It won Favourite Soundtrack Song at the Capital FM Awards and Single of the Year at the Loaded Awards in 2000, and Most Performed Work at the Ivor Novello Awards in 2001.  At the 2001 Brit Awards, "Pure Shores" was nominated for Song of the Year, but lost to "Rock DJ" by Robbie Williams. The track also appeared at number 54 in The Daily Telegraphs list of "100 pop songs that defined the Noughties", and at number 56 in The Observers list of the best singles of the 2000s decade. In 2018, London magazine Time Out included "Pure Shores" in its list of the 50 best pop songs at number 47.

Commercial performance
"Pure Shores" debuted at number one on the UK Singles Chart, becoming All Saints' fourth chart-topper. The single sold 199,084 copies in its first week, outselling its closest competitor by three to one. The song topped the chart for a second week with sales of 155,000 copies, before being replaced by another Orbit production, Madonna's "American Pie". "Pure Shores" spent 20 weeks on the chart, and was certified double platinum by the British Phonographic Industry (BPI) in May 2021 for track-equivalent sales of 1.2 million. It was the second best-selling single of 2000, behind Bob the Builder's "Can We Fix It?", and ranked 27th in the decade-end chart. 

The song boosted All Saints' profile internationally, becoming their most successful single since "Never Ever" (1997) in many key territories. In Europe, "Pure Shores" became the group's first chart-topper in Belgium (Wallonia), Ireland, Italy and Romania, and reached number three on the Eurochart Hot 100. In France, it peaked at number six, becoming the band's second top-10 single, and was certified gold by the Syndicat National de l'Édition Phonographique (SNEP) in 2000 for sales of 250,000 copies. It also charted in the top 10 in Belgium (Flanders), the Czech Republic, Finland, Hungary, Iceland, the Netherlands, Norway, Sweden and Switzerland.

In Australia, "Pure Shores" peaked at number four on the ARIA Charts, making it All Saints' third top-five single in the country. It was certified platinum by the Australian Recording Industry Association (ARIA) in 2000. On the Official New Zealand Music Chart, the song reached number two, being kept from the top spot by S Club 7's "Two in a Million". It marked All Saints' fourth top-10 record in New Zealand and was certified gold by Recorded Music NZ (RMNZ). In Canada, "Pure Shores" peaked at number 35 in its sixth week on the RPM singles chart, while in the US, radio programmers aired other songs from The Beach soundtrack instead, namely New Order's "Brutal" and Sugar Ray's "Spinning Away".

Music video

Background and synopsis

The music video for "Pure Shores" was directed by Vaughan Arnell, and filmed on the coast of the Holkham National Nature Reserve and Wells-next-the-Sea 
in Norfolk over three days in early January 2000. Due to the initial focus being on Blatt and Lewis, Nicole and Natalie Appleton had to ask Arnell for more visibility during filming. According to Nicole Appleton, Lewis cried and threatened to quit the shoot as a result. A police investigation was launched after a freelance photographer, Rob Howarth, claimed he was assaulted at the filming location by a security guard hired by All Saints. The video premiered on Dotmusic on 25 January 2000.

It opens with All Saints in numerous ghost-like frames, moving in blurry night vision and infrared shots on a beach. The group are then shown in an aerial view, strolling and running on sand dunes. Short scenes of DiCaprio in The Beach are intercut throughout. He is shown spinning, in a cavern, and in a confrontational scene with co-actress Tilda Swinton. All Saints are also seen singing in a concrete tunnel, and at a Norfolk beach hut resembling those of Ko Phi Phi Le from the film.

Reception
The music video received heavy rotation from MTV Australia, MTV Europe, MTV UK and British television channel The Box. It was nominated for Video of the Year at the 2001 Brit Awards, but lost to "Rock DJ". Neil McCormick of The Daily Telegraph wrote that it was unclear whether All Saints were promoting The Beach or vice versa, citing it as an example of a symbiotic relationship between the music and film industries. CBC Television placed "Pure Shores" second in its ranking of All Saints music videos, appreciating how Arnell reflected scenes from the film with the group. The Guardian included the video in its list of best subversive beach scenes, writing that the setting "feels taunting, a constant reminder of what happens when plans are ruined." Rachel O'Neill of TheJournal.ie found the video "utterly perfect" and complimented the sense of mystery it creates. BBC America's Kevin Wicks, on the other hand, derided it as "the most unflattering girl group video ever", criticising the use of night vision which made All Saints look like "hopelessly dazed raccoons".

Live performances 
To promote "Pure Shores", All Saints performed the song on television shows such as Top of the Pops, CD:UK, Sen kväll med Luuk, Wetten, dass..?, and Later with Jools Holland. The song was also included on their sets for Witnness, V2000 and Creamfields festivals in August 2000. The group then performed "Pure Shores" at the 2000 MTV Europe Music Awards, which were held on 16 November 2000 at the Ericsson Globe in Stockholm, Sweden. NME magazine complimented their "flare-clad, pristine performance". A day later, they performed on BBC's Children in Need marathon. All Saints performed the song at the 2001 World Sports Awards, held at London's Royal Albert Hall on 16 January 2001. For the performance, Natalie Appleton wore a T-shirt emblazoned with the legend 'I Love Liam' as a reference to her boyfriend, The Prodigy's Liam Howlett. At the time, the group was at the verge of splitting up, with the media noting the "irreconcilable rift had indeed developed between the four" on stage.

Upon the group's first return in 2006, it was performed on their show at the Sheperd's Bush Pavilion in London. The group wore black or white-coloured shirts teamed with big, loose-knotted ties. Eva Simpson and Caroline Hedley of the Daily Mirror said that the group "put on one hell of a show". "Pure Shores" was then performed live on Popworld on 4 November 2006 as part of promotion leading up to their new album Studio 1s release two days later. Additionally, the song was performed by All Saints on The Chart Show on 18 November 2006, and on Channel 4's T4, aired on the same day. In January 2014, Natalie Appleton performed the song with English singer Melanie C on her Sporty's Forty concert, which celebrated her 40th birthday.

Upon their second return eight years later, All Saints performed "Pure Shores" as the encore on their opening act for Backstreet Boys' In a World Like This Tour in 2014. They also sang the song in a concert at G-A-Y, and the 2014 V Festival. After the announcement of their fourth studio album Red Flag, the group performed it on the 2016 Elle Style Awards, and as the encore on their show at London's KOKO. The group also sang the song at Starnacht am Neusiedler See in Austria, that Energy Fashion Night event, as well as on Michael McIntyre's Big Show. and V Festival 2016. "Pure Shores" was included on the setlist of their 2016 Red Flag Tour. All Saints supported Take That on their Wonderland Live tour in 2017, and performed "Pure Shores" on their set as opening acts. To promote their fifth studio album Testament, they performed again the song on Radio 2 Live in Hyde Park, Children in Need Rocks 2018, and Strictly Come Dancing: It Takes Two. "Pure Shores" was also included on the setlist of the Testament Tour later that year.

Usage 
In 2002, DJ Osymyso sampled the song on his album Intro-Inspection (2002). It is also included in the 2013 video game Grand Theft Auto V on one of the game's radio stations.

Formats and track listings
CD1 and cassette single
"Pure Shores" – 4:27
"If You Don't Know What I Know" – 4:36
"Pure Shores" (The Beach Life Mix) – 4:31

CD2 single
"Pure Shores" – 4:27
"Pure Shores" (2 Da Beach U Don't Stop Remix) – 5:01
"Pure Shores" (Cosmos Remix) – 10:03

CD maxi-single
"Pure Shores" – 4:27
"If You Don't Know What I Know" – 4:36
"Pure Shores" (The Beach Life Mix) – 4:31
"Pure Shores" (2 Da Beach U Don't Stop Remix) – 5:01

Personnel
 William Orbit – producer, vocal arrangement, keyboards, guitars
 Mark "Spike" Stent – mixing
 Jake Davies – mix engineer
 Mark Endert – engineer
 Sean Spuehler – engineer, Pro Tools programming
 Andrew Nichols – assistant engineer
 Ben Georgiades – assistant engineer
 John Nelson – assistant engineer
 Shaznay Lewis – vocals, vocal arrangement
 Melanie Blatt – vocals
 Nicole Appleton – vocals
 Natalie Appleton – vocals
 Steve Sidelnyk – drums

Charts

Weekly charts

Year-end charts

Decade-end chart

Certifications

Release history

References 
Citations

Bibliography

 

2000 singles
All Saints (group) songs
Ultratop 50 Singles (Wallonia) number-one singles
Number-one singles in Italy
Number-one singles in Romania
Number-one singles in Scotland
Irish Singles Chart number-one singles
UK Singles Chart number-one singles
Songs written for films
Songs written by Shaznay Lewis
Songs written by William Orbit
Song recordings produced by William Orbit
Music videos directed by Vaughan Arnell
2000 songs
London Records singles